Mahanagar was a proposed Lucknow Metro station in Lucknow. It was not included in final line

Route plan/map

References

Lucknow Metro stations